The Ledger Plaza Hotel N'Djamena, formerly the Kempinski Hotel N'Djamena, is a luxury hotel in N'Djamena, the capital of Chad. It is located in the city center of N'Djamena, near Quartier Diguel Est. The hotel opened in 2004. It features 177 rooms and suites.

Gallery

References

External links

 Kempinski Hotel N'Djamena in the Emporis database

2004 establishments in Chad
Hotels in Chad
N'Djamena
Hotels established in 2004
Hotel buildings completed in 2004